is a Japanese animated short film written and directed by Hayao Miyazaki and released January 3, 2006. It was produced by Toshio Suzuki for Studio Ghibli for their exclusive use in the Saturn Theatre at the Ghibli Museum in Mitaka, Tokyo. The film is based on a story by Naohisa Inoue.

Plot 
A boy named Nono, living on the countryside, is making a living by selling vegetables in the city nearby. One day two strangers approach him to offer him a gem which looks a flower seed for his produce. He accepts the trade and at home he plants the seed inside a small pot. Soon a tiny planet emerges, so he continues to tend after the planet and a few days later three moons are circling around the tiny planet. Once again Nono had to leave the countryside to sells his produce and again meets the two strangers who have a final request for him.

References

External links 
 
 The Day I Bought a Star at Nausicaa.net
 
 

2006 anime films
2006 films
2000s animated short films
Anime short films
Drama anime and manga
Fantasy anime and manga
Films directed by Hayao Miyazaki
2000s Japanese-language films
Studio Ghibli animated films